Ōe Station (大江駅) is the name of two train stations in Japan:

 Ōe Station (Aichi)
 Ōe Station (Kyoto)

See also
 Oe Station